Catherine N. Downs (March 3, 1926 – December 8, 1976) was an American film actress.

Biography
Downs was born in Port Jefferson, New York. She was the daughter of James Nelson Downs and Edna Elizabeth Newman. 

A model for the Walter Thornton Agency, she was brought to Hollywood in 1944 by a 20th Century Fox talent scout. The studio initially used her as a model, giving her limited opportunities to act.

She began her film career with small roles in State Fair (1945) and The Dolly Sisters (1945). In 1946, she played the title role in My Darling Clementine and Clifton Webb's unfaithful wife in The Dark Corner. Following the success of My Darling Clementine, Downs was cast in a prison drama For You I Die (1947), an Abbott and Costello comedy The Noose Hangs High, and several Western films. In 1947, Downs was dropped by Fox for unknown reasons, and was never employed by another major studio. In 1949, she participated in a later famous Life magazine photo layout, in which she posed with other up-and-coming actresses, Marilyn Monroe, Lois Maxwell, Suzanne Dalbert, Laurette Luez, Jane Nigh, and Enrica Soma. By the early 1950s, she was appearing in low-budget films, including some science-fiction (sci-fi) stories, including the 1958 sci-fi/fantasy Missile to the Moon. She appeared in a television episode of The Lone Ranger in 1952. 
She portrayed Ann Howe in the syndicated TV series The Joe Palooka Story (1954). In 1959, she portrayed "Amelia Roberts" in the episode "Marked Deck" (S1E21) of the western TV series Bat Masterson. Downs worked sporadically on TV during the 1960s, with her final appearance in 1965 on Perry Mason as murder victim and title character Millicent Barton in "The Case of the Hasty Honeymooner".

Downs eventually abandoned acting at age 40 and remained unemployed for the rest of her life. She is now a cult-figure among sci-fi fans for her work in these Poverty Row epics.

Downs has a star on the Hollywood Walk of Fame for her contribution to television, at 6646 Hollywood Boulevard.

Personal life
On October 8, 1949, in Las Vegas, Downs married Joe Kirkwood Jr., who played the character Joe Palooka in films and on TV. The couple divorced on February 24, 1955.
On July 21, 1956, Downs married Robert M. Brunson, an electronics executive. They divorced on July 29, 1963.

In 1976, her former husband, Joe Kirkwood Jr., learned Downs was in dire financial straits. He was reportedly setting up a trust fund for her when he learned she had died of cancer at the age of 50.

She is interred at Woodlawn Cemetery, Santa Monica, California.

Filmography

References

External links

 
 

1926 births
1976 deaths
People from Port Jefferson, New York
American film actresses
American television actresses
Deaths from cancer in California
Actresses from New York (state)
Burials at Woodlawn Memorial Cemetery, Santa Monica
20th-century American actresses